Lee Jae-Suk (born 28 November 1963) is a South Korean former wrestler who competed in the 1988 Summer Olympics.

References

1963 births
Living people
Olympic wrestlers of South Korea
Wrestlers at the 1988 Summer Olympics
South Korean male sport wrestlers
Olympic bronze medalists for South Korea
Olympic medalists in wrestling
Medalists at the 1988 Summer Olympics
20th-century South Korean people
21st-century South Korean people